The Bear Sanctuary Prishtina is a sanctuary for rescued brown bears in Kosovo 22 km close to the city of Prishtina.

Background 
For many years, there was no law against keeping brown bears in Kosovo. All privately kept brown bears lived in small cages at restaurants. They were born mostly in the forests of Kosovo or Albania and snatched from their mothers by animal dealers. As restaurant bears they were supposed to attract customers, and thus profit, for their owners. In November 2010, when it became illegal to keep bears privately, there was a need for a national park as a new home for the restaurant bears rescued from captivity.

The Park

Foundation
The Bear Sanctuary Prishtina was founded in 2013 by Four Paws in collaboration with KFOR, the Municipality of Pristina, and the Ministry of Environment in Kosovo. The sanctuary provides species-appropriate place for all "restaurant bears", who now enjoy their life in large enclosures resembling the bears’ natural habitat.

The bears 
The Bear Sanctuary Prishtina has currently in care 20 brown bears (as of January 2020). These "restaurant bears" had been tracked down and registered by the government of Kosovo during the last few years and have been rescued in 2013.

Two restaurant bears, named Rambo and Luta, could not be saved, because their proprietors killed the bears only hours before the rescue team arrived.

Facilities 
The sanctuary is built on an area of sixteen hectares. In addition to the existing facilities, a new environmental education center "Thesaret e Natyrës" is opened in 2018 in order to improve the public attention to animal welfare and environmental issues in Kosovo.

References

External links
 Four Paws: project Bear Sanctuary Pristina

Parks in Kosovo
Pristina